Kadambathur, also spelt Kadambattur, is a town located in Tiruvallur district in the Indian state of Tamil Nadu. It is a census town in Tiruvallur taluk. According to the 2011 census, the town has a population of 11,235.

Districts 

Kadambathur town is part of Chennai Metropolitan Area.

Kadambathur town consists of three main areas, namely Kadambathur, Venmanabudhur and Kasavanalathur.

The Kadambathur block contains a total of 43 villages.

The town is in between Tiruvallur and Arakkonam, and the neighborhood is served by the Kadambattur railway station of the Chennai Suburban Railway Network. Kadambathur is also connected with the city (Vadapalani) by MTC bus no. "538" and also connected to other neighborhoods by Chennai buses.

Government bus routes 160, 160B, T2, 162, 538 and 519 operate from here to Kanchipuram, Tiruvallur, Sunguvarchatram, poonamallee and Vadapalani.
The major mode of transportation of Kadambathur is the railway. It is located on the Chennai - Arakkonam suburban railway route. It is very close to Chennai central, almost 45 mins travel. This town is connected with Chennai Central, Chennai Beach, Velachery, Avadi, Ambattur, Tiruvallur, Arakkonam, Thiruthani, Thirupathi and Bengaluru by suburban and passenger trains.
 

Kadambathur is located on the Thiruvallur - Kanchipuram main district road.

History of Tiruvallur District

Tiruvallur was originally known as Tiruevullur which specifies the sleeping position of the Holy Lord “Vishnu”, in the Veeraragava temple of Tiruvallur. Later people began to refer to it by names such as Trivellore and Tiruvallur. Today Tiruvallur is well known, one of the reasons being the Veeraragava Temple. The new moon day is a very auspicious day for the Lord and so for the people of the town.

The District of Tiruvallur has been carved out by bifurcating erstwhile Chengalpattu District (which was renamed as Chengalpattu-MGR/Kancheepuram at the time of 1991 Census). According to the said bifurcation Tiruvallur revenue division which included Tiruvallur, Tiruttani taluks and Uthukottai and Pallipattu sub-taluks separated from Chengalpattu District along with Ponneri and Gummidipoondi taluks of Saidapet revenue division and formed this new District. At present this District comprises eight taluks, namely Gummidipoondi, Ponneri, Uthukkottai, Tiruvallur, Poonamallee, Tiruttani, Pallipattu and Avadi and three Revenue Divisions namely Ponneri, Tiruvallur and Tiruttani.

In the far past, this region was under a chain of regimes commencing from the Pallavas during the 7th century ending with the Nawab of Arcot during the early part of 19th century when it came under British rule. In 1687, the Golkonda rulers were defeated and the region came under the Mughal emperors of Delhi. The towns and villages of this region were the scene of Carnatic wars. Battles are said to have been fought in this region during the struggle for supremacy between the English and French. The town of Pulicat was the earliest Dutch possession in India founded in 1609 which was ceded to the British in 1825. With this, the region came under British rule which ended on the 15th August, 1947 with India becoming independent.

Transport
The town is in between Tiruvallur and Arakkonam, and the neighbourhood is served by the Kadambattur railway station of the Chennai Suburban Railway Network. Kadambathur is also connected with the city (Vadapalani) by MTC bus no. "538" and also connected to other neighbourhoods by moffusil buses.

Private buses like Vasantha, Bharathi, Balaji, Sundaram, Srinivasa and Southeran transports operates from here to different locations like Tiruvallur, Kanchipuram, Uththukottai, Ponneri, Uthiramerur, Thiruvalangadu and Mappedu.

Government bus routes 160, 160B, T2, 162, 538 and 519 operates from here to Kanchipuram, Tiruvallur, Sunguvarchatiram, ponnamallee and Vadapalani.

The major mode of transportation of Kadambathur is the railway. It is located in Chennai - Arakkonam suburban railway route. It is very close to Chennai central almost 45 mins travel. This town is connected with Chennai Central, Chennai Beach, Velachery, Avadi, Ambattur, Tiruvallur, Arakkonam, Thiruthani, Thirupathi and Bengaluru by suburban and passenger trains.

Location
Kadambathur is located on the Thiruvallur - Kancheepuram main district road.

It is also strategically located between Chennai-Bangalore NH4 (14 km) and Chennai-Thirupathi NH 205 (4 km). It is located about 50 km from Chennai Koyambedu circle, 7 km from Thiruvallur and 5 km from Tiruvallur collectors office.

References

See also 

 Kadambathur.blogspot.com

Cities and towns in Tiruvallur district